"Where Love Used to Live" is a song written by Billy Sherrill and Glenn Sutton, and recorded by American country music artist David Houston. It was released in September 1968 as the first single from his album Where Love Used to Live/My Woman's Good to Me. The song peaked at number 2 on the Billboard Hot Country Singles chart. It also reached number 1 on the RPM Country Tracks chart in Canada.

Chart performance

References

1968 singles
David Houston (singer) songs
Songs written by Billy Sherrill
Songs written by Glenn Sutton
Epic Records singles
1968 songs